Odorrana chapaensis (Vietnam sucker frog or Chapa torrent frog) is a species of frog in the family Ranidae that is found in southern Yunnan in China and in northern Vietnam. It is likely that it also occurs in nearby areas of Laos.

In parts of its range it is threatened by habitat loss.

References

chapaensis
Frogs of China
Amphibians of Vietnam
Amphibians described in 1937
Taxa named by René Léon Bourret
Taxonomy articles created by Polbot